Simone Bonalumi (born 23 December 1994) is an Italian professional footballer who plays as a centre back.

Club career
Bonalumi started his career in Eccellenza club Base 96, and in 2013–14 season he joined to Serie D club Giana Erminio. He won the promotion with his new club at the first season, and made his Serie C debut on 5 September 2014 against Lumezzane.

On 30 August 2019, he joined to Arzignano Valchiampo.

After one season, Bonalumi returned to Giana Erminio.

On 25 July 2022, Bonalumi signed with Gelbison, freshly promoted to Serie C. His contract with Gelbison was terminated by mutual consent on 21 December 2022.

References

External links
 
 

1994 births
People from Sesto San Giovanni
Sportspeople from the Metropolitan City of Milan
Footballers from Lombardy
Living people
Italian footballers
Association football forwards
A.S. Giana Erminio players
F.C. Arzignano Valchiampo players
Serie C players
Serie D players
Eccellenza players